Atelopus arthuri, Arthur's stubfoot toad, is a species of toad in the family Bufonidae endemic to Ecuador. Its natural habitats are subtropical or tropical moist montane forests, subtropical or tropical high-altitude grasslands, and rivers. It is threatened by habitat loss. It has not been seen since the nineteen eighties and is considered probably extinct.

References

arthuri
Amphibians of Ecuador
Amphibians of the Andes
Amphibians described in 1973
Taxonomy articles created by Polbot